G.O.A.T. is the eleventh studio album by Indian-Punjabi vocalist Diljit Dosanjh, released on July 30, 2020, by Famous Studios. Title track of the album and its music video was released a day prior to album release. Songs were written by Karan Aujla, Raj Ranjodh, Amrit Maan, and other artists. The album was produced by various artists including Desi Crew and The Kidd.

Background 
The album was announced by Dosanjh in 2018.

Track listing 
Track listing and credits as per Diljit Dosanjh's Instagram:

Personnel 

 Diljit Dosanjh – vocals, executive producer
 Nimrat Khaira – featured artist 
 Kaur B – featured artist 
 J Roe & I Am Fame – additional vocals 
 Adonis – additional vocals

Technical personnel 
 Dense – engineer 
 Q Made the Beat – engineer (1,4,6,7,8,9,10,11,12,13,14,15)
 Desi Crew – producer 
 G-Funk – producer 
 Sumit Grover – engineer 
 Intense – producer 
 Deep Jandu – producer 
 Urban King – producer 
 The Kidd – producer 
 Tom Lowry – engineer 
 YoungStarr Pop Boy – producer 
 Mr. Rubal – producer 
 Gupz Sehra – producer 
 Ikwinder Singh – producer 
 Black Virus – producer

Charts

Album

Singles

Reception 
The title track "G.O.A.T." trended in various countries on YouTube. The song debuted at number 1 on Apple Music chart in India. Also, "Clash" and "Navi Navi Yaari" from the album debuted in top 5. The album topped most of the platform charts in India. The song "G.O.A.T." debuted at number 2 on UK Asian chart by Official Charts Company and number 13 on New Zealand Hot Singles by Recorded Music NZ. Also, Dosanjh entered Social 50 chart by Billboard, following the release of the album. Also, the album entered top 20 on Canadian Albums Chart.

References 

2020 albums
Albums by Indian artists